Six is an unincorporated community in McDowell County, West Virginia, United States.

The community took its name from Mine Number 6, a nearby coal mine.

See also
 List of places with numeric names

References

Unincorporated communities in McDowell County, West Virginia
Unincorporated communities in West Virginia
Coal towns in West Virginia